Searching for Jerry Garcia is the second and final studio album by Detroit rapper Proof of D12, released on August 9, 2005. It was the only solo album that Proof released on a major record label before his death. The album is named after Grateful Dead member Jerry Garcia. The album's release date, August 9, 2005, intentionally coincided with the ten-year anniversary of Garcia's death.

Album title
Proof found inspiration in an unlikely person — the late jam rocker Jerry Garcia, saying to Rolling Stone Magazine: "I was watching Searching for Bobby Fischer and Mark Hicks (D12's manager) put in a Jerry Garcia documentary. In this movie, he talked about never doing the same show twice. I did that to D12 sets overseas. Plus, he didn't care about record sales — he just wanted to make fans happy."

The album was released August 9, 2005, the tenth anniversary of Garcia's death, on Proof's independent label, Iron Fist Records. "I called his estate, and I couldn't believe they gave me permission [to use the name]!" says the rapper. "They didn't ask for money. So I'm like a disciple, preaching the gospel of Jerry Garcia. The dude is phenomenal."

Besides Garcia, Proof also gives a shout-out to Nirvana's late frontman in Searching's closing track, "Kurt Kobain" [sic]. "The circumstances of Kurt's death are freaky to me. I don't think he killed himself," Proof says. "But I'm not trying to keep Elvis alive, and I'm not saying that Tupac is in Cuba."

Recording & composition
Songs included on this album had been recorded as early as 2002. The original version of "72nd & Central" was available to download for free under the title "1x1" that year on his official site along with "Violence" and "Yzark", the latter appearing on I Miss the Hip Hop Shop. The original version "Clap Wit Me" was released in 2003 on a DJ Thoro mixtape. "Ali" was also released as a vinyl single in 2002 under the name "One, Two" with it also being included on The Electric Coolaid Acid Testing EP.

Commercial performance
It debuted at number 65 on the U.S. Billboard 200 Albums Chart.

Track listing

Samples
"Clap wit Me" contains a sample from "Total Satisfaction" by Brief Encounter
"Forgive Me" contains a sample from "Ghetto Qu'ran (Forgive Me)" by 50 Cent
"High Rollers" contains a sample from LTD
"No. T. Lose" contains a sample from "Snowflake" by Tamita
"M.A.D." contains a sample from "W.A.S.P." by The Doors. It also references to "The Dope Show" by Marilyn Manson
"Black Wrist Bro's" contains a sample taken from the motion picture The Boondock Saints
"Kurt Kobain" contains a sample from "Blue Sky and Silver Bird" by Lamont Dozier

Notes
 For a "limited time" this album shipped as a box set including "clean" and "explicit" album editions as well as a "special edition" DVD, containing interviews and other similar content.
 On the clean / edited version of the album the track "Jump Biatch" was listed as "Jump B***ch".
 The limited DVD contains unreleased footage from  D12's European Tour, also included is a behind the scenes look at the making of Searching for Jerry Garcia.

Personnel

DeShaun Holton – vocals, songwriter
Brian Gardner – mastering engineer
Gustavo Gonzalez – engineer (assistant) on tracks 5–6, 11 and 14
Jeremy Mackenzie – engineer (assistant) on tracks 2, 8, 11 and 19
Richard  Huredia – mixer on tracks 2, 3, 5–6, 8–9 and 11–20
Brian Berryman – recorder on tracks 2, 6, 8–9, 15 and 17–20
Jared Gosslin – recorder on tracks 12–13, 16 and 20
Tony Campana – recorder on tracks 3, 5, 11–13, 15 and 17–18
Dennis Friel – package art and design
Mark Riddle – package art and design
Emile Haynie – producer on tracks 2 and 20
Nick Speed – producer on track 3
Curtis Jackson – guest vocals on track 5
Larry Louis – bass on track 5
Chaz Conley – keyboards on tracks 5 and 18
Curtis Cross – producer on track 6 and 8
Louis Freese – producer and guest vocals on track 9
Clifford Smith  – guest vocals on track 9
Marshall Mathers  – producer and mixer on track 1 and guest vocals on track 11
Von Carlisle  – guest vocals on track 11

Ondre Moore – guest vocals on tracks 11 and 17
Arthur Johnson – guest vocals on track 11
Erik Coomes – guitars and bass on track 11
Kamasi Washington – saxophone on track 11
Isaac Smith – trombone on track 11
Josef Leimberg – trumpet on track 11
Traci Nelson – additional vocals on track 11
Farid Nassar – producer on track 11 and keyboards on track 15
Eric Breed – guest vocals on track 12
Anthony Fiddler – keyboards and co-producer on track 12
Shelton Rivers – producer on tracks 12 and 16
Waverly Alford – guest vocals on track 13
Shaphan Williams – additional keyboards on track 13
David Willis – producer on track 14
Jude Angelini – guest vocals on track 15
Salam Nassar – producer on track 15 and recorder on track 19
Obie Trice – guest vocals on track 16
Jimmy Hill - guest vocals on track 16 and co recorder 
Nathaniel Hale – guest vocals on track 17
Brandon "Dirty Bird" Parrott – producer on track 17
Denaun Porter – producer and guest vocals on track 19

Chart history

References

2005 albums
Proof (rapper) albums
Albums produced by Ski Beatz
Albums produced by Black Milk
Albums produced by Mr. Porter
Albums produced by Nick Speed
Albums produced by Emile Haynie
Albums produced by Fredwreck
Albums produced by Eminem